Becky Lucas is an Australian comedian, writer, and presenter. She is best known as a stand-up comedian and for her roles in Australian television series.

Early life 
Lucas was born in Brisbane. Her parents are both Australian and her mother was a country musician.

Career 
Lucas was a finalist in the 2013 Raw Comedy competition. In 2014 she relocated to Sydney. Lucas has since performed solo stand-up shows at the Sydney Opera House and the Melbourne International Comedy Festival Gala.

On Australian television, Lucas hosted an ABC2 documentary about domestic violence in Australia entitled Big Bad Love in 2016. She starred in the sketch comedy series Orange Is the New Brown and At Home Alone Together. Lucas has also made appearances on Fancy Boy, Hughesy, We Have a Problem, and Saturday Night Rove.

Lucas has written for ABC comedy series Please Like Me and Squinters. She also co-wrote the sitcom The Other Guy alongside its star Matt Okine.

In 2018, Lucas posted a joke on Twitter about beheading Prime Minister Scott Morrison, it resulted in her Twitter account being banned.

In 2019, Lucas opened for Conan O'Brien in Sydney, and performed stand-up on his US late-night show Conan. O'Brien, who Lucas regards as an idol, allegedly told her "you need medication" after their Sydney performance.

References

External links

Australian television writers
Australian women television writers
Australian women comedians
Living people
Year of birth missing (living people)
People educated at Brisbane State High School